An overview of films produced by the Bollywood film industry based in Mumbai in 1950:

1950
The ten highest-grossing films at the Indian Box Office in 1950:

A-D

E-L

M-P

R-Z

References

External links
 Bollywood films of 1950 at the Internet Movie Database

1950
Bollywood
Films, Bollywood